Vice Admiral Awwal Zubairu Gambo   (born 22 April 1966)  is a Nigerian navy vice admiral, who is the Chief of Naval Staff of the Federal Republic of Nigeria, appointed by President Muhammadu Buhari on 26 January 2021.

Early life 
He is from Nassarawa Local Government Area of Kano State, and was a member of Regular Course 36 of the Nigerian Defence Academy.

Military career 
He enlisted into the Nigerian Navy on 24 September 1984 as a member of Regular Course 36 and was commissioned Sub-Lieutenant 24 September 1988. He is an Underwater Warfare specialist with a subspecialisation in Intelligence.

Prior his appointment as Chief of Naval Staff, he was Director of Procurement at the Defence Space Administration. He holds a PhD in Transport Management and a Masters Degree in Transport Management (Logistic Option), both from Ladoke Akintola University.

He is a member of the Nigerian Institute of Management, NIM; Fellow of the Certified  Institute of Shipping; Fellow of the Institute of Corporate Administration of Nigeria, as well as a fellow of the National Defence College South Africa.

Awards
In October 2022, a Nigerian national honour of Commander of the Order of the Federal Republic (CFR) was conferred on him by President Muhammadu Buhari.

References 

Living people
Chiefs of Naval Staff (Nigeria)
Nigerian Navy officers
Nigerian Defence Academy alumni
Ladoke Akintola University of Technology alumni
1966 births